The Dell Medical School is the graduate medical school of The University of Texas at Austin in Austin, Texas. The school opened to the inaugural class of 50 students in the summer of 2016 as the newest of 18 colleges and schools on the UT Austin campus. S. Claiborne "Clay" Johnston, M.D., Ph.D., was named as the medical school's inaugural dean in January 2014. On September 1, 2021 Johnston stepped down from his position and George Macones was named interim dean.

In accordance with the Medical District Master Plan released in 2013, the University's portion of the medical district is being constructed in four phases. The new medical campus includes the Health Transformation Building, Health Learning Building, Health Discovery Building and Health Center Garage. They sit on existing University property at the southeastern corner of the central campus, adjacent to the UT School of Nursing and to the Dell Seton Medical Center at The University of Texas—the new $295 million, 211-bed teaching hospital that Seton Healthcare built.

In late 2011, Texas Senator Kirk Watson created a list of ten health-care centered goals he hoped to achieve within ten years for his Central Texas district.  Number one on that list was to build a medical school.  In May 2012, the Board of Regents allocated $25 million of annual funding to a UT Austin medical school, plus another $40 million spread over eight years for faculty recruiting.  In November 2012, Travis County voters approved a proposition to raise property tax revenue in support of health care initiatives for Central Texas, including $35 million annually for a medical school. The school refused to fill out the U.S. News statistical survey, so it is unranked for both Research and Primary Care by U.S. News & World Report.

The medical school is named after the Michael & Susan Dell Foundation, which has pledged $50 million over ten years to the school.

Notes and references

External links

 
 

University of Texas at Austin schools, colleges, and departments
Medical schools in Texas
2013 establishments in Texas
Educational institutions established in 2013